Maja Palaveršić-Coopersmith (born 24 March 1973) is a Croatian former tennis player that played for Yugoslavia and Croatia. Together with Nadin Ercegović, Gorana Matić and Maja Murić she was a member of the original Croatian Fed Cup team in 1992.

She was coached by her husband, Roy Coopersmith, with whom she has two children. Her daughter, Nicole, plays international tennis on the junior and pro circuits.

Career highlights
Significant wins include victories over top 10 players like Daniela Hantuchová, Roberta Vinci and top 15 players like Kirsten Flipkens.

ITF Circuit finals

Singles: 10 (6–4)

Doubles: 11 (5–6)

References

External links
 
 
 

1973 births
Living people
Yugoslav female tennis players
Croatian female tennis players
Tennis players from Split, Croatia